Greg Powers (born March 17, 1946) is an American professional golfer.

Amateur career 
Powers was born and raised in Albany, New York. He had a "brilliant amateur career" while growing up in Albany. Powers attended Memphis State University and played on the golf team from 1967 to 1970. In his sophomore year, Powers led the team to an 8–0 record with victories in the Sunkist Tournament, Buckhalter Tournament, and the LSU Invitational Tournament.

Professional career 
Powers turned professional in 1970. He would settle in Tennessee and would win several local professional tournaments in the state during the 1970s. However it took him several years to reach the PGA Tour. In 1976, he achieved tour status for the second time but found little success, missing the cut in nearly half the events and earning only $4,000 for the entire season. In 1978, he reached the tour for the third time. He had a chance to win an event early in the season at the Doral-Ryder Open. He played in the final group with Jack Nicklaus and Tom Weiskopf for the 36-hole Sunday finale, two off the lead. On the first hole, Powers hit three shots into the water which led to a quintuple bogey 10. He would not be in contention again, ultimately recording a third round 80 (+8). Despite this disappointing finish, Powers would go on to his best season up to that point, recording his first top-10 finishes and keeping his card for the first time.

Powers' next good chance to win was at the 1981 Western Open. He tied the 36-hole record at 136 (−8). Like his experience at Doral, however, he had a disappointing third round, shooting a 75 (+3) to fall out of the lead. He would shoot a solid 70 in the final round, however, birdieing 5 of his final 7 holes, to finish in a tie for second place. This would be the best official finish of his career. In 1981, he would record an additional five top-10 finishes and finish 53rd on the money list. It would easily be his best year on tour.

In 1983, Powers played excellently at two satellite tournaments. He finished runner-up at the 1983 Tallahassee Open. Powers was well inside of Bob Charles, his competitor, on the first playoff hole but Charles made a 45-foot birdie and Powers missed his 20-foot putt. The following month he was −9 after the first 13 holes of the Chattanooga Classic, another satellite event, threatening to shoot in the 50s for the first time in his career. He ultimately would shoot a 64 (−7) to tie for the first round lead.

Powers maintained full-time status for the next two seasons but had few highlights, only recording a handful of top-25 finishes and missing the majority of cuts. He would not play full-time on the PGA Tour after the 1988 season. He played on the Ben Hogan Tour, the PGA Tour's developmental tour, in the early 1990s.

On October 5, 1992, Powers was severely injured in a car crash. Returning from a Boys and Girls Club benefit in Nashville, Powers "topped a hill" and had to abruptly stop at an intersection. He hit the brakes too late and his car crossed the intersection and went down an embankment. Rescue workers had to use the "jaws of life" to save him. His thigh bone was ripped out of his hip socket, essentially ending his career. Powers did not have medical insurance for these huge costs, which was nearly $100,000. The following March, during the Nestle Invitational, his fellow professionals participated in a benefit tournament to help him. He also received a letter from Ben Hogan, who himself was severely injured in an auto accident in the middle of his career. Hogan wrote, "I know from personal experience that recovery from an automobile accident is certainly possible. So you keep battling and you will soon overcome this bad interlude in your life." Powers read the letter "a hundred times" as inspiration through rehap.

Later in life, Powers worked for PGA Tour radio.

Professional wins
1974 Tennessee PGA Championship
1975 Tennessee Open, Nashville Pro-Am
1977 Tennessee PGA Championship

Results in major championships 

Sources:
Note: Powers never played in the Masters Tournament.

CUT = missed the half-way cut
"T" = tied

See also 

 1971 PGA Tour Qualifying School graduates

References

External links
 

American male golfers
Memphis Tigers men's golfers
PGA Tour golfers
Golfers from New York (state)
Sportspeople from Albany, New York
1946 births
Living people